Twin Princess of Wonder Planet Gyu! is a 2006 Japanese sequel to the anime television series Twin Princess of Wonder Planet. The anime series was produced by Nihon Ad Systems under the direction of Junichi Sato and consists of fifty-two episodes. The series was first broadcast on TV Tokyo in Japan between April 1, 2006 and March 31, 2007.

Three pieces of theme music are used for the first season—one opening theme and two closing themes. The opening theme is  performed by Flip-Flap. The first closing theme is  performed by Fine☆Rein and the second closing theme is  performed by Wonder☆5.

Episode list

References 
 Official Japanese website

See also
 List of Fushigiboshi no Futagohime episodes

2006 Japanese television seasons
2007 Japanese television seasons
Lists of anime episodes